
Year 11 BC was either a common year starting on Monday or Tuesday or a leap year starting on Sunday, Monday or Tuesday (link will display the full calendar) of the Julian calendar (the sources differ, see leap year error for further information) and a common year starting on Saturday of the Proleptic Julian calendar. At the time, it was known as the Year of the Consulship of Tubero and Maximus (or, less frequently, year 743 Ab urbe condita). The denomination 11 BC for this year has been used since the early medieval period, when the Anno Domini calendar era became the prevalent method in Europe for naming years.

Events 
 By place 
 Roman Empire 
 Quintus Aelius Tubero and Paullus Fabius Maximus are Roman Consuls.
 Battle of the Lupia River: Roman forces under Augustus's stepson Nero Claudius Drusus win a victory in Germania.
 Battle of Arbalo: Roman forces under Augustus's stepson Nero Claudius Drusus beat off a Germanian ambush.
 May – Drusus secures the Rhine frontier and builds Roman fortresses near Bonn, Dorsten, Haltern, and Oberaden.

Births 
 Herod Agrippa, king of Judea (d. AD 44)

Deaths 
 Octavia the Younger, sister of Augustus (b. 69 BC)

References